Adoramus te (Latin, "We adore Thee") is a stanza that is recited or sung mostly during the ritual of the Stations of the Cross. 

Primarily a Catholic tradition, is retained in some confessional Anglican and Lutheran denominations during the Good Friday liturgy, although it is recited generally in the vernacular. It is recited or sung between stations. The words in Latin and an English translation are as follows:

Text

External links
Thesaurus Precum Latinarum

Stations of the Cross
Christian songs